Oreana is a monotypic snout moth genus described by George Duryea Hulst in 1887. Its only species, Oreana unicolorella, described by Hulst one year earlier, is known from most of North America.

The larvae feed on maple, birch, hawthorn, apple, oak, willow, basswood and elm.

References

External links
 

Moths described in 1887
Phycitinae
Monotypic moth genera
Moths of North America